is a retired Japanese professional baseball outfielder who played for the Chunichi Dragons in Japan's Nippon Professional Baseball. He is now part of scouting department with the Dragons.

External links

References

1984 births
Living people
Asian Games medalists in baseball
Asian Games silver medalists for Japan
Baseball players at the 2006 Asian Games
Chunichi Dragons players
Japanese baseball players
Komazawa University alumni
Medalists at the 2006 Asian Games
People from Okayama Prefecture